Fahmi Idris (Born in Jakarta on September 20, 1943 - May 22, 2022) was an Indonesian prominent businessman and politician. He was an Indonesian government minister under the Habibie and Yudhoyono presidencies. He received a doctorate title from University of Indonesia as well as appointed a Honorary Professor at State University of Padang.

Life 
Fahmi was one of the Minangkabau people who was born in Kenari, Central Jakarta on September 20, 1943. His father, Idris Marah Bagindo, was a trader who migrated from West Sumatra to Jakarta. Fahmi studied at Faculty of Economics University of Indonesia where he was a chairman of the student council.

After becoming an activist during the transition to the New Order era, in the late 1960s he became an entrepreneur. In 1969, he founded PT Kwarta Daya Pratama and joined PT Krama Yudha four years later. In 1978, he co-established Kodel (Kongsi Delapan) Group with Soegeng Saryadi, Aburizal Bakrie, Pontjo Sutowo, and Said Umar Husin, and became president director. The group continuously expanded its business into wide ranging sectors, such as insurance, chemicals, agribusiness, banking, real estate, and hotels. The groups own the Regent Hotel (now Four Seasons Hotel) and Hotel Ibis Tamarin (both in Jakarta) and the sole agent of Land Rover in Indonesia.

Fahmi was also an accomplished politician. In the Golkar party, he was believed to have strong and far reaching patronage network. In 1998, he sat on the central board of party and in that year was appointed Minister of Manpower and Transmigration. He did not join the cabinet during Abdurrahman Wahid and Megawati presidencies. Under Susilo Bambang Yudhoyono presidency, he returned to the position of Minister of Manpower and Transmigration. In 2005, he survived a cabinet reshuffle and moved on to become Minister for Industry.

References

External links 
 Profil singkat
 Profil di tokohindonesia.com 
 Profil di TEMPO
 Biodata beserta daftar kekayaan

1943 births
2022 deaths
Government ministers of Indonesia
Deaths from the COVID-19 pandemic in Indonesia
Minangkabau people
Golkar politicians
Industry ministers of Indonesia